The backwater butterfly ray, butterfly ray, diamond ray, or short-tailed ray (Gymnura natalensis) is a species of fish in the family Gymnuridae. It is found in Mozambique, Namibia, South Africa, possibly Kenya, and possibly Tanzania. Its natural habitats are open seas, shallow seas, estuarine waters, and coastal saline lagoons. It is threatened by habitat loss. It was considered common from 1940s-1960s.

References

Gymnura
Taxonomy articles created by Polbot
Fish described in 1911
Taxa named by John Dow Fisher Gilchrist
Taxa named by William Wardlaw Thompson